Georgios Mitzou or Mitsou (Greek: Γεώργιος Μήτζου, Γεώργιος Μήτσου) was a Greek revolutionary leader during the Greek War of Independence.

He descended from an old military family.  He was famous under the pseudonym Captain George.  A street in Pyrgos is named after him.

See also
Petros Mitzou

References
The first version of the article is translated and is based from the article at the Greek Wikipedia (el:Main Page)

People from Pyrgos, Elis
Greek military leaders of the Greek War of Independence
Year of birth unknown
Year of death unknown